Seven is the upcoming seventh studio album by American rock band Winger. The album is slated for release on May 5, 2023. On March 10, they released the album's first single, "Proud Desperado". The album marks the return of guitarist/keyboardist Paul Taylor to the band, since 1990's In the Heart of the Young.

Track listing

Personnel
Winger
Kip Winger – lead vocals, bass, acoustic guitar, keyboards
Reb Beach – co-lead guitar, background vocals
John Roth – co-lead guitar, background vocals
Paul Taylor – co-lead guitar, keyboards, background vocals
Rod Morgenstein – drums

Production
Kip Winger – producer, mixing
Ted Jensen – mastering

References

2023 albums
Winger (band) albums
Frontiers Records albums
Albums produced by Kip Winger